Acacia validinervia also commonly known as nyalanyalara, nyala nyala, alumaru or blue wattle, is a shrub of the genus Acacia and the subgenus Phyllodineae endemic to arid areas of inland Australia.

Description
It can have a straggly or spindly habit with multiple stems. The glabrous branchlets and branches are covered in a fine, white powdery coating. Like most species of Acacia it has phyllodes rather than true leaves. The evergreen phyllodes have an elliptic to oblanceolate shape that can be slightly recurved. It blooms from July to August and produces yellow flowers. The spherical inflorescences flower-heads have a diameter of  containing 50 to 80 densely packed golden flowers.

Distribution
It is native to an area in the desert in the Central Ranges of the eastern Goldfields region of Western Australia growing in red sand, stony sand, loamy or clay soils. The shrub is also found in north western South Australia and southern parts of the Northern Territory. The range of the species extends from as far west as Warburton in the Blackstone and Cavenagh and Blackstone Ranges to the north western margins of the Simpson Desert in the Northern Territory in the north down to around the Musgrave and Tomkinson Ranges of South Australia where it is situated along dry creeks and river beds.

See also
 List of Acacia species

References

validinervia
Acacias of Western Australia
Flora of South Australia
Flora of the Northern Territory
Taxa named by Joseph Maiden
Taxa named by William Blakely
Plants described in 1928